Villa Estrella is a 2009 Philippine horror film directed by Rico Maria Ilarde and starring Shaina Magdayao, Jake Cuenca, Maja Salvador, Geoff Eigenmann, and John Estrada. It was produced by Star Cinema for its 16th anniversary offering.

Plot
How come people who go there were never seen again? Does the villa "eat" people alive?

The film tells the story of Anna (Shaina Magdayao) who has been having nightmares about certain people getting killed. Things became scarier when her ex-boyfriend Alex (Jake Cuenca) brings her to Villa Estrella where she met a girl named Gisele (Maja Salvador) who seems to be very familiar to her 

One day, Anna meets a little girl named Jenifer (Celine Lim) who lives in Villa Estrella. After meeting Jenifer, she then encountered Suzy (Rubi Rubi) who said that the little girl who lived there was a ghost. They also found out that that Alex mimicked on their love affair but Anna was very cruel.

One night, Eddie (John Arcilla) talked to Dave about the statement of a deadly ghost named Danica just to be moved away on its nightmares to other worst things, later Otap (Empoy Marquez) was riding on Dennis' Car to find his way back home and also on the other hand He gone too far to realized that there was an emergency came but Anna survived then she moved on her bedroom but have no clothes she'd wearing while Andrea cane there, she gave her an apology.

One Night, Jennifer went missing because Danica found her on the window and never been found back and also Suzy metapharized that she had to participate at the Olympics. Then after that, Alex and Dennis had gone face to face and fought because they have revealed one's secret relationship. After the fight, Otap found death but Anna talk to Dennis about her lost necklace but in the other way, Suzy was about to leave the Villa then Anna recognized that Jennifer later changed her life to others soul due to this incident last night. Andrea was definitely not so satisfied with her emotions. She later transformed into a supernatural monster.

Since at the intensive expulsion on Andrea's life back to the past that the motive Eddie was a serial killer including Dave.

Looking after her life that Anna Do was immediately trying to kill Andrea and Eddie onto the dangerous situation but also Andrea killed to death.

One year later, Gusting is seen washing dishes. Anna looks over Alex, who fell asleep clutching a magazine.  Anna and Gusting share a meal together, she makes a mistake of calling Gusting “Dad”. Anna looks over at her reflection in a framed photo on the wall. It is revealed that she is Andrea in Anna’s body. 

Later on, she sees a silhouette outside her window. Upon investigation, she is choked by Anna’s angry ghost.

Cast

Promotions
Villa Estrella had a lack of promotion from both Star Cinema and ABS-CBN, having no movie premiere night due to the lead actors Shaina Magdayao, Jake Cuenca and Maja Salvador being in the United States for the Star Magic World Concert Tour from June 26–28 at Ontario and San Francisco, California.  Making it nearly impossible for them to fly back to Manila in time to have their movie premiere night.

Box office
Despite being poorly advertised, Villa Estrella debuted at no. 3 on its 1st week run earning P 21M in Metro Manila alone, occupying 2nd spot was Ice Age 3: Dawn of the Dinosaurs earning P 36.6M in its 1st-week run and the top spot was Transformers: Revenge of the Fallen which was on its 2nd-week run.

Villa Estrella on its 2nd week run stayed in no. 3, earned P36,343,703.9.

Villa Estrella total gross for its 4-week run is P46,394,496.00.

See also
 List of ghost films

References

External links

Official Mini Website

2009 horror films
2009 films
Philippine horror films
2000s Tagalog-language films
Star Cinema films
Films directed by Rico Maria Ilarde
2000s English-language films